Vuntut Gwitchin may refer to:

 The Gwich'in people living in the Yukon
 Vuntut Gwitchin First Nation in Old Crow, Yukon
 Vuntut Gwitchin (electoral district) of the Yukon Legislative Assembly

See also
Vuntut National Park, a national park located in northern Yukon, Canada